Kaushik Banerjee is an Indian actor who is known for his work in Bengali cinema. He has appeared in more than a 100 films throughout his career of four decades.

Born to the ace actor Haradhan Bannerjee, he made his acting debut opposite Mahua Roychoudhury in Dinen Gupta's Bengali romantic film Priyatama (1980). He claimed to fame for his lascivious role as Devendra in Ajoy Kar's Bishabriksha (1984) which is based on the novel of the same name by Bankim Chandra Chatterjee. Since his role as Devendra was much celebrated, he has often been typecast in salacious, negative roles in a number of Bengali films. He collaborated with Aparna Sen in Paromitar Ek Din (2000), Rituparno Ghosh in Shubho Mahurat (2003) and Chitrangada: The Crowning Wish (2012).

Personal life
He is married to Laboni Sarkar. He has a son, named Susnato Banerjee.

Filmography

 Priyotama (1979)
 Pakadekha (1980)
 Dadar kirti, as guest (1980)
 Phatik Chand (1983)
 Bhalobasha Bhalobasha (1985)
 Surer Bhubane (1992)
 Priya (1992)
 Apan Par (1992)
 Samparka (1993)
 Daan Pratidan (1993)
 Wheel Chair (1994)
 Rajar Raja (1994)
 Pratyaghat (1994)
 Mahabharati (1994)
 Kalpurush (1994)
 Rakhal Raja (1995)
 Premsangee (1995)
 Naginkanya (1995)
 Lathi (1996)
 Samadhan (1997)
 Premsangee (1997)
 Pabitra Papi (1997)
 Mittir Barir Chhoto Bou (1997)
 Mahabir Krishna (1997)
 Bahurupa (1997)
 Sagar Banya (1998)
 Ranakshetra (1998)
 Naag Nagini (1998)
 Mayer Dibyi (1998)
 Swamir Ghar (1999)
 Sundar Bou (1999)
 Satyam Shivam Sundaram (1999)
 Satru Dhwansa (1999)
 Madhu Malati (1999)
 Krishna Kaberi (1999)
 Kanchanmala (1999)
 Daye Dayitwa (1999)
 Swashurbari Zindabad (2000)
 Paromitar Ekdin (2000)
 Mayna (2000)
 Bhalobasi Tomake (2000)
 Ashray (2000)
 Prem Pratigya (2001)
 Pratibad (2001)
 Jamaibabu Zindabad (2001)
 Jabab Chai (2001)
 Guru Shisya (2001)
 Streer Maryada (2002)
 Sonar Sansar (2002)
 Protarak (2002)
 Shatrur Mokabila (2002) as OC Shankar
 Prem Shakti (2002)
 Pratihinsa (2002)
 Kurukshetra (2002) as Protul Roy
 Janam Janamer Sathi (2002)
 Sukh Dukkher Sansar (2003)
 Sharbari (2003)
 Rakta Bandhan (2003)
 Rakhe Hari Mare Ke (2003)
 Memsaheb (2003)
 Guru (2003)
 Andha Prem (2003)
 Premi (2004)
 Adhikar (2004)
 Abhishek (2004)
 Yuddho (2005)
 Debi (2005)
 Dada (2005)
 Chita (2005)
 Agnipath (2005)
 Mahasangram (2006)
 Eri Naam Prem (2006)
 Agnipariksha (2006)
 Niswabda (2007)
 Minister Fatakesto (2007)
 Aloy Phera (2007)
 Mahakaal (2008)
 Rajkumar (2008)
 Badla (2009)
 Love Circus (2010)
 Ganyer Meye Sovona (2010)
 Antim Shwash Sundar (2010)
 Mahanagari (2010)
 Kachhe Achho Tumi (2010)
 Bejanma (2010)
 Sedin Dekha Hoyechilo (2010)
 Romeo (2011) ... Pooja's Father
 Hridoye Lekho Naam (2012)
 Chitrangada (2012)
 Gundaraj (2013)
 Dekha Na Dekhay (2013)
 Chupi Chupi (2013)
 Abhimaan(2016)
 Antoral (2013)
 Love Express (2016) as Prasanta Sen

Tumi Ashbe Bole(2021)

Television
Jamuna Dhaki as Kedar Roy
Netaji as Tara Prasanna Bose
Karunamoyee Rani Rashmoni( Uttar Parbo) as Sabarna Roy Choudhury
Dutta And Bouma
Tumpa Autowali
Panchami

References

External links
 

Living people
Indian male film actors
Indian Hindus
Male actors in Bengali cinema
Bengali Hindus
1957 births